Bengt Hallberg (13 September 1932 – 2 July 2013) was a Swedish jazz pianist, composer and arranger.

Born in Gothenburg, he studied classical piano from an early age, and wrote his first jazz arrangement at the age of 13. At the age of 15 he recorded his first record as a member of a group led by bassist Thore Jederby and in 1949 he recorded with the Swedish alto saxophonist Arne Domnérus for the first time, and the two musicians continued to play together for several decades.

During the 1950s, Hallberg played with leading visiting American players, including the tenor saxophonist Stan Getz, recording "Dear Old Stockholm" (originally "Ack Värmeland du sköna") with him, and alto player  Lee Konitz in 1951, and trumpeters Clifford Brown and Quincy Jones in 1953. Jones first recorded arrangement featured Hallberg. In the same period he worked with baritone saxophonist Lars Gullin, another leading Swedish player of the time. Both players were associated with the 'Cool Jazz' scene in their country, influenced by the American school around pianist Lennie Tristano, a Hallberg favourite with whom Konitz was associated.

Hallberg had a versatile style and in his later years he wrote music for film and television, as well as choral arrangements, and he also played the accordion. With Domnerus and Georg Riedel among others, he participated in the Jazz at the Pawnshop sessions in December 1976. According to  Chris Mosey, while Hallberg was: "usually an extremely delicate and very measured player, [he] was obviously affected by the general ambience, and here and there cuts loose with awesome force".

Hallberg died from congestive heart failure.

Discography

As leader

As sideman
With Stan Getz
 Stan Getz in Stockholm (Verve, 1955)
 Imported from Europe (Verve, 1958)
With Quincy Jones
 Jazz Abroad (EmArcy, 1955)
 Quincy's Home Again (Metronome, 1958) also released as Harry Arnold + Big Band + Quincy Jones = Jazz! (EmArcy)

See also 
 List of jazz pianists

References

External links

1932 births
2013 deaths
Philips Records artists
Swedish film score composers
Male film score composers
Swedish jazz pianists
20th-century pianists
Male pianists
20th-century Swedish male musicians
20th-century Swedish musicians
Male jazz musicians
Radiojazzgruppen members
Prestige Records artists
Columbia Records artists
Epic Records artists